Sameera Perera (born 20 August 1988) is a Sri Lankan cricketer. He is a right-handed batsman and slow left-arm bowler who plays for Ragama Cricket Club. He was born in Kegalle.

Perera made his debut for the side during the 2009–10 season, against Colts, though he had to wait until his following appearance for his debut outing with the bat, scoring a duck against Chilaw Marians.

External links
Sameera Perera at CricketArchive 

1988 births
Living people
Sri Lankan cricketers
Ragama Cricket Club cricketers